Jack Howarth (born 27 February 1945) is an English retired professional footballer who played as a centre forward. Active in England and the United States, Howarth made over 500 appearances in the Football League, scoring nearly 200 goals. His 171 league goals for Aldershot is a club record.

Career
Born in Crook, County Durham, Howarth began his career with local side Stanley United. He signed professional forms with Chelsea in 1963, but never made an appearance for them, and moved to Swindon Town a year later. Howarth also played in the Football League for Aldershot, Rochdale, Bournemouth and Southport, before moving to the United States to play for the Southern California Lazers of the second division American Soccer League.

He has a place in the history of the original Aldershot side (which was founded in 1926 and went bankrupt in 1992, having been Football League members since 1932), having scored a record 196 goals for the club in all competitions.

Howarth later returned to England to play non-league football with Basingstoke Town, Andover and Romsey Town.

References

External links
Profile at Post War English & Scottish Football League A - Z Player's Transfer Database
Aldershot F.C. - Where Are They Now?

1945 births
Living people
English footballers
Chelsea F.C. players
Swindon Town F.C. players
Aldershot F.C. players
Rochdale A.F.C. players
AFC Bournemouth players
Southport F.C. players
Basingstoke Town F.C. players
People from Crook, County Durham
Footballers from County Durham
Romsey Town F.C. players
Andover F.C. players
Association football forwards
English expatriate footballers
American Soccer League (1933–1983) players
Expatriate soccer players in the United States